Huntington Place (formerly known as Cobo Hall, Cobo Center, and briefly as TCF Center) is a convention center in Downtown Detroit, owned by the Detroit Regional Convention Facility Authority (DRCFA) and operated by ASM Global. Located at 1 Washington Boulevard, the facility was originally named after former Mayor of Detroit Albert Cobo.

The largest annual event held at Huntington Place is the North American International Auto Show (NAIAS), which has been held at the center since 1965.

Facilities
It previously featured an arena, Cobo Arena, which hosted various concerts, sporting events, and other events. In 2015, the facility completed a renovation that repurposed the Cobo Arena space, adding additional meeting halls, a glass atrium with a view of the Detroit riverfront, and the  Grand Riverview Ballroom.

It is served by the Detroit People Mover with its own station. Huntington Place has several large, attached parking garages, as well as parking on the roof of the facility, and direct access to the Lodge Freeway. The facility is located along the Detroit International Riverfront, and within walking distance of several downtown hotels.

History

The facility and its attached arena initially cost $56 million. It was designed by the Detroit architectural firm Giffels & Rossetti and took four years to complete. Louis Rossetti was the chief architect. The facility is on the site where Antoine de la Mothe Cadillac, a French colonist, first set foot and landed on the banks of the river in July 1701 and claimed the area for France in the name of King Louis XIV. The first convention at the facility was held in 1960 by the Florists' Telegraph Delivery (FTD). The first event was the 43rd Auto Industry Dinner on October 17, 1960, at which President Dwight D. Eisenhower was the keynote speaker.

Joe Louis Arena, named after boxer and former heavyweight champion Joe Louis, was built adjacent to the facility. It served as the home of the Detroit Red Wings of the National Hockey League from 1979 until its closure in 2017 when they moved to Little Caesars Arena. Demolition of the arena began in 2019.

In 2009, Mayor Kenneth Cockrel Jr. vetoed the Detroit City Council's resolution against the expansion of the facility. Shortly after, the facility came under ownership and operation, through a 30-year capital lease, of the Detroit Regional Convention Facility Authority (DRCFA). The five-member Authority Board consists of one representative from each of five government agencies – the City of Detroit, State of Michigan and the three Metro Detroit counties of Wayne, Oakland and Macomb. Consensus agreement from the authority is needed for all decisions, and it has become a model for regional cooperation in Southeast Michigan.

In October 2010, the DRCFA awarded a management contract to SMG, which merged with AEG Facilities to form ASM Global in 2019. It extended the contract for three years in September 2013 and again in June 2017. In 2015, a five-year, $279 million renovation was completed, including a new atrium, ballroom, and meeting spaces, constructed mainly within the former Cobo Arena building.

In 2017, in the wake of the 50th anniversary of the 1967 Detroit riot, current mayor Mike Duggan proposed that Cobo Center be renamed due to modern reappraisals of Cobo's tenure as mayor. Cobo had upheld exclusionary covenants against African Americans, and was accused of responding poorly to allegations of harassment and police brutality against African American residents. In 2018, the DRCFA stated that it had already been considering the sale of naming rights to the facility, for the first time in its history.

In June 2018, the DRCFA approved a 22-year naming rights agreement with Chemical Bank, which took effect on July 1, 2018; the following month, Chemical announced that it would relocate its headquarters to downtown Detroit. The deal would not be publicly announced until February 20, 2019; the parties agreed to delay the official announcement until Chemical finalized and announced its agreement to merge with the Minnesota-based TCF Financial Corporation.  A new name for Cobo Center was not formally announced at this time, as the bank wanted to wait until after the completion of the merger. In the meantime, Chemical Bank logos would appear on advertising and signage at the facility, and a ceremonial bust of Albert Cobo was removed from public display. The Chemical–TCF merger was completed on August 1, 2019, and the combined company took on the TCF name. Cobo Center was officially renamed TCF Center on August 27, 2019.

On December 13, 2020, TCF announced another merger with Columbus, Ohio-based Huntington Bancshares. The merged company would operate under the Huntington name, and it was expected that TCF Center would be renamed by mid-2022. The merger was completed in June 2021, and on December 9, 2021, it was announced that TCF Center had been renamed Huntington Place.

Notable events 

Since 1965, the largest event held at Huntington Place is the North American International Auto Show (NAIAS). This event draws thousands of international press and suppliers during its initial five days and has a charity preview party for 11,000 guests before the public opening. Since 1976, the Charity Preview has raised an average of $2.4 million yearly for southeastern Michigan children's charities. After the Charity Preview party, the NAIAS is open to the public for ten days, drawing, on average, 735,000 attendees. The show was originally held in January, but was to move to June beginning in 2020.

On March 29, 2020, it was announced that the 2020 NAIAS had been cancelled due to the worldwide COVID-19 pandemic. The 2021 NAIAS was also cancelled and replaced by a downsized outdoor event in Pontiac, Michigan.

In 1961, the show car event Detroit Autorama moved to the facility, and has been held there ever since.

Cobo Arena

Cobo Arena was an arena built in 1960 with seating for 12,000 that served as the home court of the Detroit Pistons of the National Basketball Association from 1961 to 1978 and the host of the NCAA Division I Men's Indoor Track and Field Championships from 1965 to 1981. The short-lived Michigan Stags of the World Hockey Association and the Detroit Loves of World TeamTennis called Cobo Arena home in 1974, as did the Detroit Rockers of the National Professional Soccer League, the Detroit Mercy Titans basketball team of the NCAA,  and the Motor City Mustangs of Roller Hockey International.

Cobo also hosted rock concerts, by such artists as The Doors, J. Geils Band, Queen, Black Sabbath, Journey, Jimi Hendrix, The Rolling Stones, Alice Cooper, Kiss, Iron Maiden (twice in 1982), David Bowie, Ted Nugent, Prince, The Tragically Hip, The Who, Judy Garland, Led Zeppelin, Bruce Springsteen, Parliament-Funkadelic, Duran Duran, the Cure, Phish, Madonna, Anthrax, Exodus and Helloween. Bob Seger recorded all of Live Bullet and part of Nine Tonight at Cobo Arena. Yes recorded two songs at Cobo Arena for their Yesshows album, released in 1980. Kiss recorded most of live album Alive! and video Animalize Live Uncensored at the arena and it is featured in their video for "Modern Day Delilah".

On August 4 and 5, 1980, Journey recorded most of their live album Captured at Cobo Arena.

As the venue for Big Time Wrestling on every other Saturday night in the 1960s and 1970s, it was considered to be "The House the Sheik built." It also hosted Skate America in 1995.

WWE and WCW also hosted numerous house shows in the arena during the 1990s, but WWE would return in 2006 for the premiere of the 2006 edition of Saturday Night's Main Event.

On June 23, 1963, following the Detroit Walk to Freedom civil rights march, Martin Luther King Jr. delivered the original version of his "I Have a Dream" speech at Cobo Arena to a full house.

In January 1994, during the U.S. Figure Skating Championships at Joe Louis Arena, skater Nancy Kerrigan was bludgeoned in her right lower thigh by an assailant in a corridor of Cobo Arena, which was being used as a practice facility. The assault, which was dubbed "the whack heard 'round the world", was planned by rival Tonya Harding's ex-husband Jeff Gillooly and co-conspirator Shawn Eckardt, in a plot to prevent her from competing at the championships and the 1994 Winter Olympics.

Cobo Arena closed in 2010 as part of a major renovation completed in 2015. The space was used to construct new facilities, including the  Grand Riverview Ballroom, a new atrium area, 21 additional meeting rooms, and an outdoor terrace.

See also

 Suburban Collection Showplace - Metro Detroit's second largest convention center

References

External links
 
 Detroit Regional Convention Facility Authority website

Convention centers in Michigan
Sports venues in Detroit
Downtown Detroit
Buildings and structures completed in 1960
Basketball venues in Michigan
Former National Basketball Association venues
Detroit Pistons venues
Indoor ice hockey venues in Detroit
Indoor soccer venues in Michigan
Indoor track and field venues in Michigan
Ontario Hockey League arenas
World Hockey Association venues
Event venues established in 1960
1960 establishments in Michigan
Continental Basketball Association venues